Albert Bartlett may refer to:

 Albert Bartlett (cricketer) (1900–1968), Australian cricketer
 Albert Allen Bartlett (1923–2013), American physicist
 Albert Charles Bartlett (fl. c. 1927), British electrical engineer
 Albert Bartlett (footballer) (1884–1969), English professional footballer
 Albert L. Bartlett (1851–1934), American politician in Massachusetts